Carl Stubner is an American talent manager and entertainment industry veteran who has guided the careers of a number of prominent entertainers including Fleetwood Mac, ZZ Top and Andrew Dice Clay.

Career
Stubner began his entertainment career in 1989 in the mail room of management firm Gallin Morey Associates, where he struck up a close relationship with comedian Andrew Dice Clay, eventually becoming his tour director.

By 1993, Stubner launched his own artist management company, Deluxe Entertainment, where he managed several acts including C+C Music Factory, House of Pain and Mick Fleetwood. During this time, Stubner helped to reunite the members of Fleetwood Mac which resulted in a top-rated MTV special and a world tour.

In 1999, Deluxe was merged with Eagle Cove Entertainment where Stubner was responsible for producing a number of hit soundtracks, including Dr. Dolittle II, Big Momma's House, Next Friday and Detroit Rock City. Stubner signed Tommy Lee during this time, and the duo went on to create a number of multimedia endeavors, including records by Lee's Methods of Mayhem, solo albums, the autobiography Tommyland, and the TV shows Rock Star: Supernova, Tommy Lee Goes to College and Battleground Earth.

In 2002, Stubner was made partner at Immortal Entertainment and appointed president of the firm's music management division. He brought several acts into the fold at Immortal including The Cult, Everlast, Tommy Lee and Mick Fleetwood.

In 2003, it was announced that Stubner would be joining Sanctuary Artist Management as co-president.

By 2004, Stubner had been named CEO of Sanctuary Artist Management, and shortly thereafter, he signed Texas rockers ZZ Top. As CEO of Sanctuary, he oversaw such prominent acts as Elton John and Stubner was named CEO of Sanctuary Music Group under the new ownership. Stubner also opened the firm's Nashville branch, expanding both the firm's country and rock artist rosters.

References

Year of birth missing (living people)
Living people
American talent agents